The Syunik rebellion of 1722–1730 (Syunik Liberation Struggle) was a rebellion against the invading Ottoman Empire in the southeastern region of Armenia. Sometimes the movement would fight battles against local Persian armies as well. The main objectives were to clear the area of Turkish troops and to liberate it under the control of local Armenians. The leaders of the liberation movement were David Bek and Mkhitar Sparapet.

The general battle took place in  the spring of 1727 at Halidzor Fortress, in what is now the Syunik region of Armenia, near the modern-day city of Kapan, between the Armenian forces under the leadership of David Bek and the Ottoman army.

Battle of Halidzor 
The main account of the Battle of Halidzor comes from the mid-eighteenth-century Armenian work Patmutiun Ghapantsvots by Ghukas Sebastatsi. The battle took place amidst a larger military campaign launched by the Ottoman Empire in the 1720s to secure control over the South Caucasus. The Ottomans encountered fierce resistance by local Armenian princes and lords in Syunik, especially near the town of Kapan, with David Bek, Mkhitar Sparapet and Ter Avetis at the head of small make-shift forces. 

In the spring of 1727, pursued by the Ottomans, David Bek and his followers took refuge in the fortress at Halidzor. The Ottoman army put Halidzor under siege but came under incessant attacks launched by small Armenian units from the fortress. David Bek's comrades-in-arms, Mkhitar and Ter Avetis did their best to boost the morale of the men in the fortress, proclaiming, "Take heart, do not be afraid, follow us, and if our end has arrived, let us die bravely, because for us it is better to die with courage outside the walls than to see before our eyes the death of our families and friends inside the walls."

After seven days, the Ottomans abandoned their emplacements and retreated. According to Armenian sources the remnants of the army dispersed across the region, with confusion and panic raging among its ranks.

References 
 Revue des études arméniennes: Volume 9 by Fundação Calouste Gulbenkian, Société des études armeniennes - , pg.305

Specific

Wars involving Armenia 
Wars involving the Ottoman Empire
18th century in Armenia
Battles involving Armenia
1727 in military history
Conflicts in 1727